Mitä muut ajattelevat sinusta? is the first work released by the Finnish progressive rock band Tuvalu.

Track listing
"Suuret tunteet" — 4:40
"Myöhäistä katua" — 4:27
"Kuolemankello" — 4:17
"Säätyttö" — 6:09

External links
Mitä muut ajattelevat sinusta? at BSA-store.com

Tuvalu (band) albums
2004 EPs